This is a list of members of the Tasmanian House of Assembly, elected at the 2018 state election.

1 Braddon MHA Adam Brooks resigned on 12 February 2019. He was replaced in a recount held on 25 February 2019 by Joan Rylah. Rylah then resigned on 27 July 2020 and was replaced in a recount held on 17 August 2020 by Felix Ellis.
2 Lyons MHA Rene Hidding resigned on 25 February 2019. He was replaced in a recount held on 12 March 2019 by John Tucker.
3 On 28 September 2018, the division of Denison was renamed to Clark.
4 Clark MHA Scott Bacon resigned on 22 August 2019. He was replaced in a recount held on 10 September 2019 by Madeleine Ogilvie.
5 Franklin MHA and Premier of Tasmania Will Hodgman resigned on 20 January 2020. Former Franklin MHA Nic Street replaced him in a recount held on 6 February 2020.
6 Clark MHA and Speaker of the Assembly Sue Hickey resigned from the Liberal Party to sit as an independent on 22 March 2021, after being informed by Premier Peter Gutwein she would not re-endorsed as a Liberal candidate at the next general election.

See also
List of past members of the Tasmanian House of Assembly

References
ABC Elections

Members of Tasmanian parliaments by term
21st-century Australian politicians